Georges Deneubourg (1860–1936) was a French stage and film actor.

Selected filmography
 La Tosca (1908)
 Les Amours de la reine Élisabeth (1912)
 Mothers of France (1917)
 The Fall of the Romanoffs (1917)
 The Thirteenth Chair (1919)
 Tarnished Reputations (1920)
 La gitanilla (1924)
 The Thruster (1924)
 The Abbot Constantine (1925)
 Prince Jean (1928)
 The Farewell Waltz (1928)
 The Crime of Sylvestre Bonnard (1929)
 The Ladies in the Green Hats (1929)
 Cagliostro (1929)
 The Eaglet (1931)
 Ronny (1931)
 Tossing Ship (1932)
 The Beautiful Adventure (1932)
 Madame Bovary (1934)

References

Bibliography
 Goble, Alan. The Complete Index to Literary Sources in Film. Walter de Gruyter, 1999.

External links

1860 births
1936 deaths
French male film actors
French male silent film actors
20th-century French male actors
French male stage actors
Male actors from Paris